Lester James Herrick (14 December 1827 – 18 April 1892) was a Mormon missionary and politician. He was elected mayor of Ogden, Utah for seven two-year terms. He held the office in 1871, 1873, 1875, 1879, and 1881. He was a local businessman in the area and had earlier served as the Sheriff of Weber County, Utah, in 1860.

References 

Mayors of places in Utah
Politicians from Ogden, Utah
Utah sheriffs
1827 births
1892 deaths